Eternity is the first Korean EP released in 2008 by Kangta. It is his fourth and last solo album before leaving for his military duties.

Track listing
 어느날 가슴이 말했다 (Eternity)
 너를 닮아 (Still With You)
 책갈피 (Reminiscence)
 그래서 미안합니다 (Since you’ve gone)
 7989 (Duet with Taeyeon)
 가슴에 남아 (Still my heart)
 어느 날 가슴이 말했다 (Eternity) (Inst.)
 책갈피 (Reminiscence) (Inst.)

External links
 Kangta's official website 
 SM Entertainment's official website

2008 EPs
Kangta albums
SM Entertainment albums